Herbert Sidney Bonn (January 14, 1916 – April 7, 1943) was an American professional basketball player and World War II fighter pilot. After a college career at Duquesne University in which he was a first-team All-American in 1935–36, Bonn played in the National Basketball League for the Pittsburgh Pirates between 1937 and 1939. In his 15-game NBL career, Bonn averaged 5.7 points per game. He fought in World War II in the United States Navy and was killed in action in a crash off Hawaii.

Military career and death
On April 7, 1943, Bonn took off from Kanoehe Airfield on Oahu in a B-24 Liberator with a crew of ten. Whilst conducting a night navigation operation, Bonn's aircraft crashed into the South Pacific Ocean. When the Liberator did not return, all 10 on board were listed missing in action, presumed dead. Bonn and his crew have no known grave, and they are memorialized at the Punchbowl Cemetery.

References

External links

1916 births
1943 deaths
20th-century American Jews
All-American college men's basketball players
American men's basketball players
Basketball players from Pittsburgh
Duquesne Dukes men's basketball players
Forwards (basketball)
Jewish American sportspeople
Jewish men's basketball players
Missing in action of World War II
People from Aliquippa, Pennsylvania
Pittsburgh Pirates (NBL) players
United States Navy pilots of World War II
United States Navy personnel killed in World War II
United States Navy officers